Giuseppe Insalaco (12 October 1941 – 12 January 1988) was an Italian politician.

He has served as Mayor of Palermo from 17 April 1984 to 13 July 1984. He was Mayor of Palermo for three months.

Giuseppe Insalaco is remembered every year on 21 March in the Day of remembrance and commitment of libera.

Biography
Giuseppe Insalaco was born in San Giuseppe Jato, Italy on 1941 and died in Palermo, Italy on 1988 at the age of 46. He was killed by the mafia. He was later shot and killed while in the car on 12 January 1988. He was buried in the graveyard of Santa Maria de Guess.

See also
 List of mayors of Palermo

References 

1941 births
1988 deaths
People from San Giuseppe Jato
20th-century Italian women politicians
Mayors of Palermo